Malekabad (also Romanized as Malekābād; also known as Malekābād-e Korbāl and Malek Abad Korbal) is a village in Band-e Amir Rural District, Zarqan District, Shiraz County, Fars Province, Iran. At the 2006 census, its population was 185, in 49 families.

References 

Populated places in Zarqan County